The 1937 William & Mary Indians football team represented the College of William & Mary as a member of the Southern Conference (SoCon) during the 1937 college football season. Led by fifth-year head coach Branch Bocock, the Indians compiled an overall record of 4–5 with a mark of 1–3 in conference play, placing 13th in the SoCon. William & Mary played home games at Cary Field in Williamsburg, Virginia.

Schedule

References

William and Mary
William & Mary Tribe football seasons
William